The 2019 Presidents Cup was the 13th edition of the Presidents Cup golf competition, held at Royal Melbourne Golf Club in Melbourne, Victoria, from 12 to 15 December 2019. Royal Melbourne previously hosted the tournament in 1998, at which the International team had their only victory, and 2011. It is the only international venue to have held the tournament more than once.

The United States retained the cup, winning the competition 16–14. Trailing before the final day singles matches, they won six and tied four of the 12 matches.

Team qualification and selection
Both teams had 12 players. On 18 August 2019, the eight automatic qualifiers for each team were finalized.

International team
The International team featured the top 8 players with the most Official World Golf Ranking points accumulated between 27 August 2018 (Dell Technologies Championship) and 18 August 2019 (BMW Championship) and four captain's picks made in early November. This was a change from 2017 when selection was based on the leading players in the Official World Golf Ranking. The number of captain's picks was also increased from two to four.

The final standings were:

United States team
The United States team featured the 8 players who earned the most official FedExCup points from the 2017 BMW Championship through the 2019 BMW Championship, with points earned in the 2018–19 season counting double, and four captain's picks. Points for events in the FedEx Cup Playoffs were weighted the same as WGC events. The four captain's picks were made in early November. In 2017 only events in the 2017 calendar year counted double. As with the international team the number of captain's picks was increased from two to four.

The final standings were:

Teams

Captains
Tiger Woods captained the U.S. team, and Ernie Els captained the International team.	

Woods chose Fred Couples, Zach Johnson and Steve Stricker as his assistants. Els chose K. J. Choi, Geoff Ogilvy, Trevor Immelman and Mike Weir as his assistants.

Woods was the first playing captain in a Presidents Cup since Hale Irwin in 1994.

Players

Brooks Koepka originally made the U.S. team but withdrew with a knee injury. He was replaced by Fowler.
''Jason Day was originally a captain's pick for the International team but withdrew with a back injury. He was replaced by An.
Captain's picks shown in yellow
Ages as of 12 December; OWGR as of 8 December, the last ranking before the Cup

Notables
Abraham Ancer (Mexico), Li Haotong (China), Joaquín Niemann (Chile) and Pan Cheng-tsung (Chinese Taipei) became the first players of their respective countries to play in the Presidents Cup.

This was also the first Presidents Cup without Phil Mickelson.

Broadcast
Golf Channel had the official coverage of the 2019 Presidents Cup in the United States.

Thursday's fourball matches
Despite losing the opening match, the International team won the session 4–1. This was just the fourth time that the International team had led after the opening session of a Presidents Cup match and the 3 point lead was the largest it had ever had after the opening session.

Friday's foursomes matches
The International team looked like they would extend their lead but the United States had good finishes in three of the matches to leave the session tied. Patrick Cantlay and Xander Schauffele birdied the final hole to win their match against Joaquín Niemann and Adam Hadwin and later Tiger Woods and Justin Thomas did the same against Hideki Matsuyama and An Byeong-hun. In the final match, Rickie Fowler and Gary Woodland tied their match against Cameron Smith and Im Sung-jae after being two down with three holes to play.

Saturday's matches

Morning fourball
The International team extended their lead to four points with two wins and a tie in the four matches. An Byeong-hun and Adam Scott had taken a one-hole lead at the 15th hole against Tony Finau and Matt Kuchar but Finau won the final hole with a birdie 3 to tie the match.

Afternoon foursomes
At one stage the United States led in all four matches but the International team recovered to tie two of the matches. Rickie Fowler and Justin Thomas were 5 up after 7 holes against Abraham Ancer and Marc Leishman and were still 5 up with 8 holes to play. However Ancer and Leishman tied the match, winning the last three holes. Joaquín Niemann and An Byeong-hun also came from behind to tie their match against Tony Finau and Matt Kuchar, giving the International team a two-point lead at the start of the final day.

Sunday's singles matches
Tiger Woods played the first match for the US and made 7 birdies in 16 holes to defeat Abraham Ancer. Woods, with a 3–0–0 record, was the only player without a loss or tie in the competition. Down by two points at the start of the day, the US took six of the singles matches and rallied to win by a score of 16–14. This was the eighth straight Presidents Cup victory for the US.

Individual player records
Each entry refers to the win–loss–tie record of the player.

International

United States

References

External links

Presidents Cup Official Media Guide

Presidents Cup
Golf tournaments in Australia
Sports competitions in Melbourne
Presidents Cup
Presidents Cup